Erich Schneider (12 August 1894 – 3 August 1980) was a general in the Wehrmacht of Nazi Germany during World War II. He was a recipient of the Knight's Cross of the Iron Cross with Oak Leaves.

Awards and decorations
 Iron Cross (1914) 2nd Class (22 September 1915) & 1st Class (26 October 1916)
 Clasp to the Iron Cross (1939) 2nd Class (24 June 1941) & 1st Class (16 July 1941)
 Knight's Cross of the Iron Cross with Oak Leaves
 Knight's Cross on 5 May 1943 as Generalmajor and commander of the 4. Panzer-Division
 Oak Leaves on 6 March 1945 as Generalleutnant and commander of 14. Infanterie-Division

References

Citations

Bibliography

1894 births
1980 deaths
German Army personnel of World War I
German prisoners of war in World War II held by the United Kingdom
Lieutenant generals of the German Army (Wehrmacht)
People from the Grand Duchy of Hesse
People from Marburg-Biedenkopf
Prussian Army personnel
Recipients of the clasp to the Iron Cross, 1st class
Recipients of the Knight's Cross of the Iron Cross with Oak Leaves
Reichswehr personnel
German Army generals of World War II
Military personnel from Hesse